Orchis mascula, the early-purple orchid, early spring orchis, is a species of flowering plant in the orchid family, Orchidaceae.

Description 
The root system consists of two tubers, rounded or ellipsoid. The leaves, grouped at the base of the stem, are oblong-lanceolate, pale green, sometimes with brownish-purple speckles. The lateral sepals are ovate-lanceolate and erect, the median one, together with the petals, is smaller and cover the gynostegium. The labellum is three-lobed and convex, with crenulated margins and the basal part clearer and dotted with purple-brown spots. The spur is cylindrical or clavate, horizontal or ascending. The gynostegium is short, with reddish-green anthers. It blooms from April to June.

Ecology 
This orchid is devoid of nectar and attracts pollinating insects (bees and wasps of the genera Apis, Bombus, Eucera, Andrena, Psithyrus and Xylocopa, and sometimes beetles) with the appearance of its flower which mimics other species.

Orchids in the genus Orchis form mycorrhizal partnerships mainly with fungi in the family Tulasnellaceae. Orchis mascula has been suggested to have only one mycorrhizal partner, in the Tulasnellaceae.

Distribution and habitat 
The species is widespread across Europe, from Portugal to the Caucasus (Ireland, Great Britain, The Faroe Islands, Norway, Sweden, Finland, Latvia, Spain, France, Belgium, Netherlands, Germany, Denmark, Austria, Hungary, the Czech Republic, Switzerland, Italy, former Yugoslavia, Albania, Greece, Turkey, Bulgaria, Romania, Poland, Ukraine, most of Russia), in northwest Africa (Algeria, Tunisia, Morocco) and in the Middle East (Lebanon, Syria, Iraq) up to Iran. (Codes)

It grows in a variety of habitats, from meadows to mountain pastures and woods, in full sun or shady areas, from sea level to 2,500 metres (8,000 ft) altitude.

Taxonomy 

The specific epithet is derived from the Latin , meaning "male" or "virile"; this could refer to the robust aspect of this species, or to the shape of the two tubers, which resemble testicles.

Subspecies 
, the World Checklist of Selected Plant Families recognizes five subspecies:
 Orchis mascula subsp. ichnusae Corrias
 Orchis mascula subsp. laxifloriformis Rivas Goday & B.Rodr. (including O. langei, O. mascula subsp. hispanica)
 Orchis mascula subsp. mascula (including O. mascula subsp. pinetorum)
 Orchis mascula subsp. scopulorum (Summerh.) H.Sund. ex H.Kretzschmar, Eccarius & H.Dietr.
 Orchis mascula subsp. speciosa (Mutel) Hegi

Synonyms

 Orchidactyla kromayeri (M.Schulze)  & Soó 1966
 Orchidactyla pentecostalis (Wettst. & Sennholz) Borsos & Soó 1966
 Orchidactyla speciosissima (Wettst. & Sennholz) Borsos & Soó 1966
 Orchis brevicornis var. fallax De Not. 1844
 Orchis cochleata Fleischm. & M.Schulze 1902
 Orchis compressiflora Stokes 1812
 Orchis fallax (De Not.) Willk. in Willk. & J.M.C.Lange 1861
 Orchis glaucophylla A.Kern. 1864
 Orchis kromayeri M.Schulze 1904
 Orchis mascula f. longifolia Landwehr 1977
 Orchis mascula subsp. occidentalis O.Schwarz 1949
 Orchis mascula subsp. signifera (Vest) Soó 1927
 Orchis mascula subsp. tenera (Landwehr)  1999
 Orchis mascula var. acutiflora W.D.J.Koch 1837
 Orchis mascula var. bicolor Balayer 1986
 Orchis mascula var. fallax E.G.Camus 1889
 Orchis mascula var. hostii Patze, E.Mey. &  1848
 Orchis mascula var. maritzii J.A.Guim. 1887
 Orchis mascula var. monsignatica Font Quer 1928
 Orchis mascula var. obtusiflora W.D.J.Koch 1837
 Orchis mascula var. speciosa Mutel 1836
 Orchis mascula var. tenera Landwehr 1977
 Orchis monsignatica (Font Quer) Rivas Goday 1941
 Orchis morio f. mascula L. 1753
 Orchis morio var. mascula L. 1753 (basionym)
 Orchis obtusa Schur 1866
 Orchis obtusiflora Schur 1853
 Orchis olivetorum Gren. ex Nyman 1882
 Orchis ovalis F.W.Schmidt 1791
 Orchis parreissii C.Presl 1845
 Orchis patens var. fallax (De Not.) Rchb.f. 1851
 Orchis pentecostalis Wettst. & Sennholz 1889
 Orchis signifera Vest 1824
 Orchis speciosa Host 1831
 Orchis speciosissima Wettst. & Sennholz 1889
 Orchis stabiana Tenore 1833
 Orchis tenera (Landwehr) Kreutz 1991
 Orchis untchji M.Schulze 1907
 Orchis vernalis Salisbury 1796
 Orchis wanjkovii E.Wulff 1930
 Orchis wilmsii K.Richt. 1890

Cultivation and uses 
A flour called salep or sachlav is made of the ground tubers of this or some other species of orchids. It contains a nutritious starch-like polysaccharide called glucomannan. In some magical traditions, its root is called Adam and Eve Root. It is said that witches used tubers of this orchid in love potions.

Culture and symbolism 
Orchis mascula is commonly thought to be the plant referred to as "long purples" in Shakespeare's Hamlet (Act 4, Scene 7):
Therewith fantastic garlands did she make
Of crow-flowers, nettles, daisies, and long purples,
That liberal shepherds give a grosser name,
But our cold maids do dead men's fingers call them.

It is not known which "grosser name" Shakespeare might have had in mind, but folk names given to plants in the Orchis family, based on their resemblance to testicles, include "dogstones", "dog's cods", "cullions" and "fool's ballocks".

However, Shakespeare's allusion is uncertain, as no contemporary herbals apply the name of "long purples" or "dead men's fingers" to Orchis mascula. (Sidney Beisly, writing in 1864, claimed that certain other species of orchid were known as "dead men's fingers" on account of their palmate roots, and that this name may have been mistakenly transferred over to Orchis mascula, but this has been called an "unverifiable assumption".) Some scholars, such as Karl P. Wentersdorf, therefore prefer to identify the "long purples" with Arum maculatum.

Another folk name of Orchis mascula is "Gethsemane" (after the Garden of Gethsemane, in which, according to the Bible, Jesus prayed on the night before his crucifixion). This name is derived from a legend "that O. mascula grew below the cross of Christ, and that the markings on the leaves are drops of Christ's blood".

References 

 Pierre Delforge - Orchids of Europe, North Africa And the Middle East - 2006, Timber Press
 Pignatti S. - Flora d'Italia (3 voll.) - Edagricole – 1982, Vol. III
 Tutin, T.G. et al. - Flora Europaea, second edition - 1993

External links 
 
 
 Den virtuella floran - Distribution
 Orchis mascula

mascula
Flora of North Africa
Flora of the Canary Islands
Flora of the Caucasus
Flora of Western Asia
Orchids of Europe
Plants described in 1753
Taxa named by Carl Linnaeus